The LUI Che Woo Prize – Prize for World Civilisation, is an international prize founded on 24 September 2015 by Lui Che Woo, Chairman of K. Wah International of Hong Kong. There are three prizes for the three objectives of the Lui Che Woo Prize, namely the "Sustainability Prize", the "Welfare Betterment Prize" and the "Positive Energy Prize". Each awardee will receive a cash award of HK$20 million (equivalent to approximately US$2.56 million), a certificate and a trophy.

Prize categories 
The LUI Che Woo Prize recognises individuals or organisations with outstanding achievements in the three Prize Categories.

 Sustainability Prize (Sustainable development of the world)
 Welfare Betterment Prize (Betterment of the welfare of mankind)
 Positive Energy Prize (Promotion of positive life attitude and enhancement of positive energy)

Laureates 
Each Prize is awarded to a single recipient (i.e. no sharing of a Prize) who can be an individual or an organisation every year. 

If there is no appropriate awardee for any Prize Category in any particular year, there will be no Prize awarded for that Prize Category in that year.

Board of Governors 
The Board of Governors is the governing body of LUI Che Woo Prize Limited. It is a charitable company limited by guarantee incorporated in Hong Kong. 

The Board of Governors leads and supervises operations of the prize company.

References

External links 

 The LUI Che Woo Prize Official Website

Awards established in 2015
Hong Kong awards